Felix Phoenix is a character from The Piratica Series, by Tanith Lee.

Name
Felix' birth name was Felix Makepeace. He later changed his surname to "Phoenix".

Wygląd
Felix ma ciemnobłękitne oczy z długimi rzęsami, białe jak lód włosy i ciemnie brwi. Kiedyś miał ciemne włosy jak ojciec ale osowiał w wieku 7 lat.

Family
Mother: Felix's mother died of shock and grief when he was 4.
Father: Felix's father was Adam Makepeace. He died of heartbreak when Felix was 8.
Uncle: Felix' paternal uncle was Solomon Makepeace. He was murdered by the Golden Goliath and his crew.
Aunt, Uncle, Cousins: Felix's maternal aunt, her husband and children were aboard Solomon's trading vessel. They were murdered by the Golden Goliath and his crew.
Spouse: Felix marries Art Blastside after the events of Piratica.
Children: Felix is expecting a child as of the end of Piratica II.

Personal history

Pre-Piratica
Felix spent his early childhood with his parents and brothers. His uncle Solomon Makepeace took his aunt and her family on a sea trading voyage, and they were killed by the Golden Goliath and his crew. Felix' mother died of shock and grief, and his brothers died of illness. Four years later, when Felix was eight, his father died.
Felix went to work in the county workhouse. Various people took him up for his talents-singing and drawing. He continued to do odd jobs for people until he met Art.

Piratica
Felix first meets Art when she holds him up and steals his coat. She locks him in an abandoned house.
While being chased by an angry mob who thinks that Felix is the notorious Highwayman Cuckoo Jack, Felix is rescued by Art and her crew. He secretly plots to turn them in to the English authorities, but later falls in love with Art and saves her life at her hanging.

Piratica II

Literary characters introduced in 2003
Characters in American novels of the 21st century